Msafiri Zawose is one among the prominent contemporary Gogo musicians. His name is associated with his traditional Gogo style music, which relies heavily on the zeze and ilimba in combination with distinct lyrical harmonies.

Early life and career 
Msafiri Zawose is the fifth child of Dr. Hukwe Zawose, The name Zawose is synonymous with Tanzanian music and tradition.

Surrounded by musicians and spending his days at the art college, Msafiri began learning music and picked up the ilimba at a young age. By his 13th birthday, he had already mastered all of the signature Gogo instruments and was already touring widely throughout the country. His international debut was a three-month tour to Japan singing, dancing, and playing ndono, ngoma, and marimba with his father’s group Chibite.

After his father’s untimely death in 2003, Msafiri resolved to pick up where his father left off.

Discography 

Dawale Chouya  was released before Msafiri's first appearance at Sauti za Busara in 2007.

Albums

Concerts, tours and shows 

 Sauti za Busara Festival, Zanzibar (2007)
 WOMAD, Abu Dhabi (2010) 
 The LEAF Festival, Black Mountain, North Carolina (May 11, 2012)
 Msafiri Zawose with Akoma Drummers @ Bossa Bistro Washington DC (June 28, 2012)
 Kuumba Festival, Knoxville, Tennessee (June 30, 2012)
 Sauti za Busara Festival, Zanzibar (2013)
 Pamoja Jam by APF Tanzania, Bagamoyo, Tanzania (May 11, 2013)
 DOADOA, Kampala, Uganda (2013) 
 Sauti za Busara Festival, Zanzibar (2015)
 Ilimba Cultural Festival, Arusha, Tanzania (August 8, 2015)
 Center Stage (Summer-Fall 2016)

References

Further reading

External links 

 http://musicinafrica.net/bayimba-arts-festival-present-diverse-music-africa?language=en

1982 births
Living people
People from Dar es Salaam
Tanzanian musicians